The 2007 IAAF World Athletics Tour was the second edition of the annual global circuit of one-day track and field competitions organized by the International Association of Athletics Federations (IAAF). The series featured 24 one-day meetings, consisting of the six meetings of the 2007 IAAF Golden League, five IAAF Super Grand Prix meetings, and thirteen IAAF Grand Prix meetings. In addition, there were 27 Area Permit Meetings that carried point-scoring events. The series culminated in the two-day 2007 IAAF World Athletics Final, held in Stuttgart, Germany from 22–23 September.

Four athletes achieved 100 points in the rankings in their event, all of them women: Sanya Richards (400 m), Maryam Yusuf Jamal (1500 m), Yelena Isinbayeva (pole vault) and Blanka Vlašić (high jump). The highest scoring male athlete was Asafa Powell in the 100 metres with 96 points – a total also reached by two athletes in the women's 100 metres hurdles (Susanna Kallur and Michelle Perry).

Schedule

Points standings
Athletes earned points at meetings during the series. The following athletes were the top performers for their event prior to the World Athletics Final.

References

2007
World Athletics Tour